

Soviet Union

Ukraine

References

 
Dnipro
Seasons